Ireland participated in the Junior Eurovision Song Contest 2018, which took place on 25 November 2018 in Minsk, Belarus. The Irish broadcaster TG4 is responsible for organising their entry for the contest through a national selection show entitled Junior Eurovision Éire. The national final took place on 11 November 2018, while the semifinals took place between 14 October and 4 November. This was Ireland's fourth appearance at the Junior Eurovision Song Contest.

Background

TG4 previously attempted to participate at the Junior Eurovision Song Contest 2014, but required funding from the Broadcasting Authority of Ireland (BAI), which was rejected.

Before Junior Eurovision
The Irish broadcaster was included in the final list of participants of the EBU, which revealed that they would be participating at Junior Eurovision for the third time in their history. The mechanism for selecting their entrant and song was through the national selection show Junior Eurovision Éire, like in their three other appearances. The selection process is scheduled to take place every Sunday starting on 14 October, where thirty-two participants competed, and culminated into a final which took place on 11 November 2018.

Jury members

Junior Eurovision Éire

Semi Final 1
The first semi final was broadcast on 14 October 2018, in which Ryan O'Shaughnessy was the guest judge and the opening act.

Saibh Skelly and Jessica Doolan both advanced to the final duel stage and performed their songs for the second time. After their second performances, the jury members selected Jessica Doolan as the winner of this semi-final and she advanced to the grand final on 11 November.

Semi Final 2
The second semi final was broadcast on 21 October 2018, in which Linda Martin was the guest judge and Aimee Banks was the opening act.

Sarah Kenny and Kerry Ann Mc Creery advanced to the final duel stage and performed their songs for the second time. After their second performances, the jury members selected Kerry Ann McCreery as the winner of this semi-final, making her advance to the grand final on 11 November.

Semi Final 3
The third semi-final was broadcast on 28 October 2018, in which Brian Kennedy was the guest judge and Zena Donnelly was the opening act.

Anna and Ava and Cora Harkin advanced to the final duel stage and performed their songs for the second time. After their second performances, the jury members selected Cora Harkin as the winner of this semi-final, making her advance to the grand final on 11 November.

Semi Final 4
The fourth semi-final was broadcast on 4 November, in which Dustin the Turkey was the guest judge and Muireann McDonnell was the opening act.

Taylor Hynes and Shaniah Llane Rollo advanced to the final duel of the show. After performing for a second time, the judges decided that Shaniah would advance to the final.

Final
The grand final was broadcast on 11 November. Niamh Kavanagh was the guest judge for this round. For the final, a sing-off was introduced between the top two contenders.

Artist and song information

Taylor Hynes
Taylor Hynes (born 7 February  2004) is an Irish child singer. He represented Ireland in the Junior Eurovision Song Contest 2018 with the song "IOU". He previously entered Junior Eurovision Eire in 2016, where he failed to make the final. He returned to the selection in 2018 and came second in his heat, however a day after his heat was broadcast, he was leaked by Belarusian TV as Ireland's Junior Eurovision entrant. He was born in Dublin, but currently lives in Clonee.

IOU
IOU is a song by Irish child singer Taylor Hynes. It represented Ireland at the Junior Eurovision Song Contest 2018. The music video clip features Hynes alongside Eurovision winner Niamh Kavanagh and 2018 Irish entrant Ryan O'Shaughnessy.

At Junior Eurovision
During the opening ceremony and the running order draw which both took place on 19 November 2018, Ireland was drawn to perform ninth on 25 November 2018, following Belarus and preceding Serbia.

Voting

Detailed voting results

References

Junior Eurovision Song Contest
Ireland
2018